Tzigane is a novel by the English writer Lady Eleanor Smith, which was first published in 1935. Along with several of her other works it contains a gypsy theme.

Film adaptation

In 1937 the novel was adapted into a film Gypsy directed by Roy William Neill.

References

Bibliography
 Low, Rachael. Filmmaking in 1930s Britain. George Allen & Unwin, 1985.
 Nicholson, Virginia. Among the Bohemians: Experiments in Living 1900-1939. Penguin, 2003.

1935 British novels
Fictional representations of Romani people
Novels set in England
Novels by Lady Eleanor Smith
British novels adapted into films